Brookfield High School can refer to:

United States 
Brookfield High School (Connecticut), Brookfield, Connecticut
Brookfield High School (Brookfield, Missouri)
Brookfield High School (Ohio), Brookfield, Ohio
Brookfield Academy, Brookfield, Wisconsin
Brookfield Academy (New Jersey), Cherry Hill, New Jersey
Brookfield Area Career Center, Brookfield, Missouri
North Brookfield High School, North Brookfield, Massachusetts
Riverside Brookfield Township High School, Riverside, Illinois
Brookfield East High School, Brookfield, Wisconsin

Non-US 
Brookfield High School (Electronic City), Bangalore
Brookfield High School (Ottawa), Ottawa, Ontario, Canada